The 1964 Newham London Borough Council election took place on 7 May 1964 to elect members of Newham London Borough Council in London, England. The whole council was up for election and the Labour Party gained control of the council.

Background
These elections were the first to the newly formed borough. Previously elections had taken place in the County Borough of East Ham, County Borough of West Ham, Metropolitan Borough of Woolwich and Municipal Borough of Barking. These boroughs were joined to form the new London Borough of Newham by the London Government Act 1963.

A total of 145 candidates stood in the election for the 60 seats being contested across 24 wards. 3 seats in one ward went unopposed. These included a full slate from the Labour Party, while the Liberal and Conservative parties stood 38 and 20 respectively. Other candidates included 17 Residents, 7 Communists and 2 Independents. There were 12 three-seat wards and 12 two-seat wards.

This election had aldermen as well as directly elected councillors.  Labour got all 10 aldermen.

The Council was elected in 1964 as a "shadow authority" but did not start operations until 1 April 1965.

Election result
The results saw Labour gain the new council with a majority of 40 after winning 50 of the 60 seats. Overall turnout in the election was 29.4%. This turnout included 333 postal votes.

|}

Results by ward

Beckton

Bemersyde

Canning Town & Grange

Castle

Central

Custom House & Silvertown

Forest Gate

Greatfield

Hudsons

Kensington

Little Ilford

Manor Park

New Town

Ordnance

Park

Plaistow

Plashet

St Stephens

South

Stratford

Upton

Wall End

West Ham

Woodgrange

By-elections between 1964 and 1968
There were no by-elections.

References

1964
1964 London Borough council elections